Wong Ting-kwong, GBS (born 12 September 1949, Hong Kong) is a former member of Legislative Council of Hong Kong (Legco), representing import and export industry in functional constituencies seats.

He is a businessman, honorary president of the Hong Kong Chinese Importers' and Exporters' Association and the member of the Democratic Alliance for the Betterment and Progress of Hong Kong. Wong was born in Hong Kong, and his ancestral hometown is Dongguan City, Guangdong province, China.

In January 2021, after a HK$280 million funding request was passed without any officials present to answer his questions, Wong was informed that he had missed a deadline to request the secretariat to have officials present, despite being a lawmaker for 16 years.

References

1949 births
Living people
Hong Kong businesspeople
Democratic Alliance for the Betterment and Progress of Hong Kong politicians
HK LegCo Members 2004–2008
HK LegCo Members 2008–2012
HK LegCo Members 2012–2016
HK LegCo Members 2016–2021
Members of the Selection Committee of Hong Kong
Recipients of the Gold Bauhinia Star
Recipients of the Silver Bauhinia Star